Thomas Holland (born 22 April 1997, Leeds), more often known as Tom Holland, is an Irish-English education advisor at the Professional Football Association (PFA) and a former professional footballer who played as a midfield-central midfield player.

Early life and education
Holland was born on 22 April 1997, in Leeds. He completed his schooling at St. Menston Catholic School. While playing football, he studied B.Sc in Sports Writing and Broadcasting at Staffordshire University in 2019 and M.Sc in Football Business at UCFB University in 2022. He also holds the UEFA B license coaching certificate.

Club career
In 2013, Holland joined Manchester City's academy as a first-year scholar from 2013 to 2015 before signing his first professional contract with Swansea City Football Club in 2015. He was a regular member of the 2016–17 squad, which won the Professional Development League title and the Premier League Cup. He was part of the under-23 squad, reaching the FL cup's quarter-final. In January 2017, he was signed by AFC Fylde on loan until the end of the season.

In 2017, Holland signed a two-year contract with The New Saints, who were the champions of the Welsh Premier League at that time. He played 74 matches, including 5 Champions League qualifiers and 2 Europa League qualifiers. In both seasons, he was nominated for Welsh Premier League Young Player of the Year. He won the club's young player of the award two years in a row.

After his contract ended with New Saints in 2019, Holland joined Waterford FC playing the latter half of the season in the Irish Premier Division. He played 18 games and scored the club's "goal of the season." In 2020, he left Waterford FC and re-signed for the New Saints on a 2.5 years deal. He made 31 appearances, including 2 Europa League Qualifiers.

International career
Holland was first inducted into the Irish under-17 national side in 2013. He made seven appearances. Then in 2016, he became part of the under-19 and under-21 levels.

He is currently the education advisor at the Professional Football Association (PFA).

References

Living people
1997 births
English footballers
Sportspeople from Leeds
The New Saints F.C. players